The 2023 GT America Series will be the third season of the SRO Motorsports Group's GT America Series, an auto racing series for grand tourer cars. The races are contested with GT2-spec, GT3-spec and GT4-spec cars. The season will begin on March 5 at St. Petersburg and end on October 9 at Indianapolis.

Calendar
The preliminary calendar was released on October 17, 2022, featuring seven rounds.

Entry list

Race results
Bold indicates overall winner

Notes

References

External links

GT America Series
GT America Series
GT America Series